Men of war may refer to:

 Men of War, a video game series
 Men of War (video game), a 2009 video game part of the series
 Men of War (film), a 1994 film starring Dolph Lundgren
 Men of War a 1993 novel by Jerry Pournelle
 Men of War (comics), a series of comic books published by DC Comics
 Lexington Men O' War, a defunct professional ice hockey team

See also
Man O' War (disambiguation)
Man of war (disambiguation)

de:Men of War